WAM or Wam may refer to:

Arts
 Weisman Art Museum, in Minneapolis
 Women's Art Movement, a feminist art organisation in Australia
 Worcester Art Museum, in Worcester, Massachusetts

People
 Arne Wam (born 1952), Norwegian journalist
 Svend Wam (1946–2017), Norwegian filmmaker
 Wam Kat (born 1956), Dutch political activist and author
 Wolfgang Amadeus Mozart (1756–1791), musician

Places
 Wam, Pakistan, a village of Ziarat District

Technology
 Warren Abstract Machine, an abstract machine for the execution of Prolog
 Web access management, a form of identity management
 Web audience measurement, a tool that measures Internet usage in India
 Wide area multilateration, a surveillance technology for air traffic management
 WAM, a kind of wind wave model

Television
 WAM (Emirates news agency), a news agency in the United Arab Emirates
 WAM!, a cable television channel for children

Other
 WAM (Wide AC electric mixed), a classification of Indian locomotives
 "Wam", a 2019 song by ASAP Ferg from the EP Floor Seats
 Weekender Records or Weekender Artist Management
 Wet and messy fetishism

See also
 Wham (disambiguation)